Nowa Pogorzel  is a village in the administrative district of Gmina Siennica, within Mińsk County, Masovian Voivodeship, in east-central Poland.

The village had a population of 225 in 2008.

References

Nowa Pogorzel